The Landstuhl Regional Medical Center (LRMC), also known as Landstuhl Hospital, is a U.S. Army post in Landstuhl, Germany, near Ramstein Air Base. The post is an amalgamation of Marceau Kaserne and Wilson Barracks (Kirchberg-Kaserne), which were merged on October 15, 1951. It is the largest American hospital outside the United States; serving the Armed Forces, military dependents, and military retirees.

History

Landstuhl Regional Medical Center (originally known as the Landstuhl Army Medical Center) was established on October 15, 1951. Completion of the 1,000-bed Army General Hospital building occurred on April 7, 1953. In 1980, soldiers who were injured in Operation Eagle Claw were brought to the hospital. During the 1990s, U.S. Army Europe underwent a major reorganization, and U.S. hospitals in Frankfurt, Berlin, Nuremberg, and other bases were gradually closed down, or were downsized to clinics. In 1993, a group of 288 U.S. Air Force Medical Service personnel augmented the hospital. By 2013, it was the only American military hospital left in Europe.

Organ donation
lmca is one of the top hospitals for organ donations in its region in Europe. Roughly half of the American military personnel who died at the hospital from combat injuries from 2005 through 2010 were organ donors. That was the first year the hospital allowed organs to be donated by military personnel who died there from wounds suffered in Iraq or Afghanistan. From 2005 to 2010, 34 donated a total of 142 organs, according to the organization German Organ Transplantation Foundation (Deutsche Stiftung Organtransplantation).

Decorations
The Landstuhl Regional Medical Center has been awarded the following unit decorations:

Honors
 VFW Armed Forces Award, July 23, 2012

See also
 Kaiserslautern Military Community
 List of U.S. Army installations in Germany
 U.S. Army Medical Materiel Center – Europe

References

Further reading

External links

 
 Army Fisher House
 Post Library
 USO Warrior Center

1951 establishments in West Germany
Buildings and structures in Landstuhl
Hospital buildings completed in 1953
Hospitals in Germany
Hospitals of the United States Army
Medical and health organisations based in Rhineland-Palatinate
Military installations established in 1951
Trauma centers
United States Army medical installations
United States Army posts